The women's 10,000 metres at the 2012 African Championships in Athletics was held at the Stade Charles de Gaulle on  30 June.

Medalists

Records

Schedule

Results

Final

References

Results

10000 Women
10,000 metres at the African Championships in Athletics
2012 in women's athletics